The Bountiful Davis Art Center is an art center based in the city of Bountiful, Utah created in 1974.

Bountiful City and the University of Utah collaborated to establish the Bountiful Davis Art Center. The BDAC became a nonprofit organization in 1984. 

They moved in different locations and are based in 90 N Main St., Bountiful, UT since 2015.

The art center organize public art exhibitions; art and theater classes for children and adults; free Family Art Nights; recital space and free musical concerts and events including the folk arts festival, Summerfest International.

The Summerfest International Art & Folk Festival is a free weekend event, held the first week in August at Bountiful City Park with live music and dance performances, ethnic food trucks, artist booths.

Exhibitions (selection) 
2022: Urban Pop : Curated by Todd Marshall

2022: Traces of the West

2020: DOORs1

2019 : Annual Davis School District Student Exhibit

2018: Echoes of a Morning Star

References

Bountiful, Utah
Arts centers in Utah